Weekend is the fifth studio album by the Swedish new wave band The Sounds.

Background
On March 11, 2013, the band announced they were working on Weekend.

Track listing
All tracks written by Jesper Anderberg, Johan Bengtsson, Maja Ivarsson, Fredrik Nilsson and Felix Rodriguez.

References

External links
The Sounds Official Website

2013 albums
The Sounds albums
Albums produced by Alex Newport